Charlie Cavanagh (born 15 June 2000) is a Canadian amateur boxer who won a silver medal at the 2022 World Championships.

Career

Youth
Cavanagh started her national team career in 2018, by winning gold at the 2018 Youth World Championships in Budapest, Hungary. Cavanagh therefore became the first ever Canadian youth world champion.

Senior
After not competing since 2019, Cavanagh was named to Canada's 2022 Pan American Championships team just days before the event. Cavanagh would go on to lose in the semifinals to Brazil's Beatriz Soares in an unanimous decision. However, Cavanagh would win the bronze medal and qualify for the 2022 IBA Women's World Boxing Championships.

At the 2022 IBA Women's World Boxing Championships, Cavanagh qualified to compete in the gold medal match and guarantee herself at least a silver medal. Cavanagh would go on to win the silver medal, losing to Turkey's Busenaz Sürmeneli after the referee stopped the contest.

References

2000 births
Living people
Canadian women boxers
21st-century Canadian people
Sportspeople from Saint John, New Brunswick
Welterweight boxers
AIBA Women's World Boxing Championships medalists